Langi Seli og Skuggarnir is an Icelandic rock band formed in 1988. The band plays exclusively from its catalogue of original music, which can be characterised as powerful rockabilly, with a particularly modern approach.

Langi Seli og Skuggarnir's musical style is influenced by early rockabilly and surf music. It has been described as "modern and vintage all at the same time".

Their lyrics cover life in its disparate forms, sometimes banal, other times fantastic.

Formed in 1988, Langi Seli og Skuggarnir released the single "Breiðholtsbúgí" in 1989; it became a hit song in Iceland and has been released on two 80s compilations. 

The band's first studio album, Rottur og kettir, was released in 1990. 

In 2009 the band came out of a seventeen-year-long hiatus, published a new studio album, Drullukalt, and resumed playing live music in Iceland.

The current lineup consists of Langi Seli (vocals and guitar), Jón Skuggi (double bass and vocals) and Erik Qvick (drums and vocals).

Former members are Kormákur Geirharðsson (drums) Steingrímur Guðmundsson (guitar) and Gísli Galdur (soundscapes and vocals).

Discography

Albums 
 1990: Rottur og kettir (LP and CD, singles included on CD)
 2009: Drullukalt (CD)

Singles 
 1988: Kontinentalinn (vinyl)
 1989: Breiðholtsbúgí (vinyl)
 2019: Bensínið er búið (vinyl)

Compilations 
 1994: Já takk - Contributed "Úti að keyra" and "Græna gatan".
 1995: Cold fever Icelandic/Japanese film "Undir Súð" Instrumental mix
 2000: Með allt á hreinu - Óður til kvikmyndar - contributed "Íslenskir karlmenn".
 2002: Alltaf sama svínið - contributed "Breiðholtsbúgí"
 2007: 100 íslensk 80s lög 5 - contributed "Breiðholtsbúgí"

Notes 

Icelandic rock music groups
Musical groups from Reykjavík